Events from 2015 in England

Incumbent

Events

January
4 January – The Höegh Osaka, a Singaporean cargo ship transporting luxury cars, runs aground near the Isle of Wight after it started listing shortly after leaving the Port of Southampton. An investigation is launched.
6 January – Figures from the last three months show that England's A&E waiting time performance has dropped to its worst levels for a decade.
9 January – Circle Holdings, the first private company to operate an NHS hospital, announces plans to withdraw from its contract to run Hinchingbrooke Hospital because it believes the franchise is "no longer viable under current terms".
12 January – 19-year-old Lewis Daynes who murdered 14-year-old Breck Bednar after meeting him online in February 2014, is sentenced to life in prison.
15 January – A set of council offices, a funeral parlour, and a thatched cottage are extensively damaged after they are set ablaze due to a spate of arson attacks in South Oxfordshire. A suspect is arrested.
17 January – Andrew Main, 47, of Rokemarsh, Roke, Wallingford, faces arson charges, one of which is intent to endanger life after spate of fires in Oxfordshire. A fire on lorry forces channel tunnel to be closed in both directions.
28 January – An earthquake of magnitude 3.8 is felt across the East Midlands.
31 January – The head of the Police Federation of England and Wales expresses his controversial support for all front-line police officers in England and Wales to be offered Tasers in light of the increased terrorism threat to the UK.

February
2 February – London's population hits a record high of 8.6m and is forecast to reach 11m by 2050.
4 February – The entire cabinet of Rotherham Borough Council announces its intention to resign from office after a report into the Rotherham child sexual exploitation scandal concludes the council's handling of the scandal was "not fit for purpose".

July
27 July – Members of the Norwich sexual abuse ring are found guilty of the sexual abuse of children, with the crimes spanning a decade. Ringleader Marie Black is convicted of 23 counts of sex abuse, including rape.

September
28 September – Members of a Norwich sexual abuse ring are jailed for "utterly depraved" sex abuse of children over a period of ten years. Ringleader Marie Black received the longest sentence of life imprisonment, with a minimum term of 24 years.

Deaths
26 June – Denis Thwaites, 70, footballer (Birmingham City), victim of the 2015 Sousse attacks.
19 December  – Greville Janner, Labour MP and lawyer (b. 1928)

See also
2015 in Northern Ireland
2015 in Scotland
2015 in Wales

References

 
England
Years of the 21st century in England
2010s in England